Richard Mendenhall Homeplace and Buildings a historic homeplace, farm and buildings in the Southeastern United States located at Jamestown, Guilford County, North Carolina. The Mendenhall farmhouse was built in 1811, and consists of a two-story, brick main block of plain typically Quaker design, with a porch on three sides and a number of additions to the west and rear.  Also on the property is a large early Red Bank Barn of the Pennsylvania German type, Underground Railroad False Bottom Wagon, One Room School House, Dr. Madison Lindsay's House, Museum, Thy Store, and a Well House.

The site is now opened for tours as Mendenhall Homeplace.

It was listed on the National Register of Historic Places in 1972.  It is located in the Jamestown Historic District.

References

External links
 Mendenall Homepace - official site

  -Facebook Page
:File:Mendenhall Homeplace Candlelight Tour.jpg

Historic American Buildings Survey in North Carolina
Houses on the National Register of Historic Places in North Carolina
Houses completed in 1811
Houses in Guilford County, North Carolina
National Register of Historic Places in Guilford County, North Carolina
Museums in Guilford County, North Carolina
Historic house museums in North Carolina
1811 establishments in North Carolina
Plantation houses in North Carolina